HD 15558 (HIP 11832) is a massive O-type multiple star system in Cassiopeia and is specifically in our galaxy's Heart Nebula in open cluster IC 1805.

Physical characteristics
HD 15558 A is a spectroscopic binary system containing at least two massive luminous class O stars. The primary is an O4.5 giant star with a surface temperature over 46,800 K. It has a mass of 152  and a luminosity of 660,000 , making it one of the most massive stars in the Milky Way Galaxy. The secondary is an O7V star. It has a mass of 46 . The primary may itself be a double star, suggested by the improbably large mass found from the binary orbit when compared to the other stellar parameters.

The Washington Double Star Catalog lists 11 companions within one arc minute of HD 15558 A, all fainter than 10th magnitude.  In addition, it lists component E just over one arc minute away; it is another hot massive star, the 9th magnitude BD+60°501 with a spectral type of O7 V(n)((f))z.

See also
 List of most massive stars
 List of most luminous stars

References

Cassiopeia (constellation)
O-type main-sequence stars
O-type giants
015558
011832
BD+60 502
Spectroscopic binaries
J02324253+6127215
Emission-line stars